The Neves-Stausee is a reservoir in the Mühlwaldertal in South Tyrol, Italy. It belongs to the municipality of Mühlwald.

External links

References 
 Anton Weissteiner, Monika Leitner: 100 Jahre Edelrauthütte. Geschichte, Geschichten und Tourenvorschläge rund um ein uriges Südtiroler Schutzhaus. CAI Sektion Brixen, 2008. Tourenbeschreibungen pp. 80, 92
 Hanspaul Menara. Die schönsten 3000er in Südtirol. Bildwanderbuch mit 70 Hochtouren. Athesia, Bozen, 2007, pp. 172−177

Reservoirs in Italy
Lakes of South Tyrol